Jan Sobotka (born 25 July 1961) is a Czech politician who has served as Mayor of Vrchlabí since 1998 and Senator from Trutnov since 2018.

Biography
Sobotka studied Brno University of Technology. He finished his studies in 1988. He worked at Agrostav D. Králové n.L. and in 1990 he started his own business.

Political career
Sobotka was a member of the Civic Democratic Party in 1990s and in 1994 he was elected a member of Vrchlabí municipal assembly. He became Mayor of Vrchlabí in 1998. He was an independent candidate nominated by Freedom Union (US). He ran as candidate of US for Senate in 2008 senate election but wasn't elected.

Sobotka ran in 2018 by-election in Trutnov district. He was nominated by Mayors and Independents and supported by the Civic Democratic Party, TOP 09 and Christian and Democratic Union – Czechoslovak People's Party. Sobotka defeated Hlavatý on 13 January 2018.

References

External links
Official site

1961 births
Living people
People from Vrchlabí
Mayors of places in the Czech Republic
Mayors and Independents politicians
Civic Democratic Party (Czech Republic) politicians
Members of the Senate of the Czech Republic
Brno University of Technology alumni